Blackwall Glacier is a tributary glacier,  long, which drains a portion of the west slope of Nilsen Plateau. It flows northwest along the northeast side of Hansen Spur to join Amundsen Glacier. The name was used by both the 1963–64 and 1970–71 Ohio State University field parties at Nilsen Plateau; all the rock walls surrounding this glacier are black in appearance.

References 

Glaciers of the Ross Dependency